Wilbur Holland (born November 8, 1951) is an American former professional basketball player.

A 6'0" guard from Columbus, Georgia, Holland played college basketball at Morristown College and the University of New Orleans, where he led his team in scoring for two seasons (1973–75).  During his senior year, he earned Division II Second Team All-America honors from the National Association of Basketball Coaches.

Upon graduating from college, Holland was selected by the Atlanta Hawks in the fifth round of the 1975 NBA Draft.  After one season with the Hawks, during which he averaged 5.8 points per game, he signed with the Chicago Bulls, and he remained with the Bulls until 1979. In the 1977 NBA Playoffs, Holland got into a fight with the Portland Trail Blazers Herm Gilliam. Holland's statistically strongest NBA season occurred in 1977–78, during which he averaged 16.6 points, 3.8 assists, 2.0 steals, and 3.6 rebounds.  He ranked among the NBA's top ten in total steals twice in his career (in 1976–77 and 1977–78).

In 2002, Holland was inducted into the Louisiana Basketball Hall of Fame.

Notes

1951 births
Living people
African-American basketball players
American expatriate basketball people in France
American expatriate basketball people in Italy
American men's basketball players
Atlanta Hawks draft picks
Atlanta Hawks players
Basketball players from Columbus, Georgia
Chicago Bulls players
Junior college men's basketball players in the United States
New Orleans Privateers men's basketball players
Point guards
Union Tours Basket Métropole players
Victoria Libertas Pallacanestro players
21st-century African-American people
20th-century African-American sportspeople